The Lea Theater, an Art Deco theater in Lovington, New Mexico, was built in 1948.  It was listed on the National Register of Historic Places in 2007.Renovations to the historic theater began on January 27, 2020 with updates to the Lobby and Concession area. 

It is a two-story building with a brick and ceramic tile facade and a triangular marquee overhanging the sidewalk.  The theater is on the south side of Lea County's courthouse square.

Its  auditorium interior seats 400.  The interior includes murals painted in the 1990s by local artist Albert Perea which show Plains Indians and cowboys.

References

National Register of Historic Places in New Mexico
Art Deco architecture in New Mexico
Theatres completed in 1948
Lea County, New Mexico
Theatres in New Mexico
New Mexico State Register of Cultural Properties